Andrea Szilasi (born 1964) is a Canadian photographer who imaginatively exploits its nature using assemblage.

Her work is included in the collections of the Musée national des beaux-arts du Québec, the Musée d'art contemporain de Montréal and the National Gallery of Canada

References

Living people
1964 births
20th-century Canadian women artists
21st-century Canadian women artists